Following is a list of granite markers placed by the Texas Society Daughters of the American Revolution that designate one of the main routes of the Old San Antonio Road through Texas as surveyed in 1915 and placed in 1918. There were never any markers numbered 103-107 because of a numbering error by the surveyor.

As of October 2015, 110 of the 123 markers have been documented. This includes 106 that have been documented since 2013 and 4 more that were documented circa 1995 and are known or assumed to still exist. 13 markers have never been documented.

Most of the stones have been moved to accommodate highway construction, ranching operations, or to get them off of private land and make them accessible to the public. As of 2015, only 34 of the 110 documented markers were within 100 feet of their original 1918 locations.

Notes

References

External links
A Tour of the Old San Antonio Road
Old San Antonio Road DAR Marker Information Site

Old San Antonio Road DAR markers
Old San Antonio Road DAR markers